Wilmer Angier Jennings (1910–1990) was an African-American printmaker, painter, and jeweler. He was hired by the Rhode Island WPA to create wood-engraved prints that explored themes of economic and social hardships experienced by African-Americans. Jennings' work also included Southern themes inspired by oral folklore traditions. During his later years, Jennings studied jewelry design, which prompted him to develop new methods of jewelry manufacturing.

Early life, Georgia and the WPA 

Wilmer Angier Jennings was born in November 13, 1910 in Atlanta, Georgia. His parents were Matilde and Levi Angier Jennings.

He attended Morehouse College in Atlanta, Georgia, where he graduated with a B.S. degree in 1933. While attending Morehouse College, Jennings studied under the artist Hale Woodruff who introduced him to the principles of modernism.

In 1934, working under the Graphic Arts Division of the Works Progress Administration (WPA), Jennings and Wiidruff worked together on two notable murals that reflected on the African-American experience: The Negro in Modern American Life: Agriculture and Rural Life, Literature, Music and Art and the second, titled The Dream. The first of the two was displayed in the David T. Howard School in Atlanta, Georgia while the second was showcased at the School of Social Work at Atlanta University. However, both are currently destroyed. During that stay in Atlanta, Jennings was able to learn the creative production that contributed to community murals. Woodruff already had an unconventional relationship with his students in which he was opposed to the typical teacher role. Because of that, Jennings was able to form a personal friendship with Woodruff, who he called by the nickname "Count" as a playful title, rather than calling him Hale. In regards to this relationship, art historian Winifred L. Stoelting, quoted Woodruff saying:

[...] "I remember they wanted to call me 'Hale' and I was reluctant for them to do that, but Wilmer Jennings always called me 'Count,' a kind of a warm title. I always appreciated it because he not only needed [to] but he wanted this kind of relationship that developed between us."

Jennings continued to work with Woodruff throughout his early career and was able to exhibit his oil painting Rendezvous, 1942, in the First Atlanta University Annual Exhibition of Works by Negro Artists, an exhibition that was organized by Woodruff.

Rhode Island 
After graduating from Morehouse College, Jennings moved to New England to attend the Rhode Island School of Design in Providence, Rhode Island. There, he was hired by the WPA where he was able to create works that represented the economic hardships of African-Americans during the Depression. During this time, he mostly used wood engraving and lino-cut relief processes. Wood engraving uses a dense block for processing and as a result, Jennings was able to create thin lines that displayed subtle detail. His Still Life, 1937 used this technique to create a shadowy quality. Lino-cut, however, uses a softer linoleum block which cannot be processed in the same way. Jennings’ Statuette, 1937, was able to emphasize contrast by creating free bold lines.

Jennings was influenced by his African roots and began incorporating African sculpture into his works. Both Still life, 1937 and Statuette, 1937 include images of an African Fang sculpture in addition to the objects found in Gabon working-class households. This included vases, urns, baskets, metal ashtrays, and textiles.

Jennings enjoyed reading and was influenced by the African-American folklore that was recorded by Zora Neale Hurston and by the poetry of Sterling Brown. Jennings's wood engraving Just Plain Ornery, 1938, represents the humor associated with folklore by presenting the stubborn mule and mule races.

After moving to Providence, Rhode Island in the mid-1930s, Jennings represented the effect of the urban development on the black community in some of his works. His prints included images of ferry boats, oil industry sites, race tracks, and the transformation of residential areas.

Jewelry design and later work 
In addition to establishing himself as a printmaker, Jennings supported his family by working as a jewelry designer. From 1943 until his death in 1990, Jennings developed a series of new techniques that benefited the company for which he worked, the Imperial Pearl Company. As a head jewelry designer and chief model maker, Jennings was able to reduce the thickness of castings by casting with rubber molds. 

And while studying at the University of Rhode Island he was able to teach himself how to cast precious metals using a lost-wax method. He also developed a method to color glass beads using alabaster and crushed colored glass which created a new jade color. His adoption of centrifugal casting as opposed to injection-molded pieces also reduced costs.

After injuring his right hand in 1957, Jennings began to train himself to draw and paint left-handed, which he continued to do up until the time of his death. The subjects of his later work included landscape and social realist scenes of his community.

Death and legacy 
He died on June 25, 1990 in Providence, Rhode Island.

Jennings has a daughter named Corrine Jennings, who is a founding director of Kenkeleba House, Inc. in New York City, which is a nonprofit dedicated to showcasing the work of underrepresented African artists. Kenkeleba House was founded in 1974 by Joe Overstreet and Samuel C. Floyd in addition to Corrine Jennings. Its name, Kenkeleba, is derived from the healing properties of the Seh-Haw plant grown in West Africa.

Exhibitions 
 1935, Arthur U. Newton Galleries, New York
 1935, "An Art Commentary on Lynching", New York
 1939, "New York World's Fair", New York World's Fair Commission of Rhode Island, Queens, New York
 1939, "Contemporary Negro Art", Washington D.C
 1940, "American Negro Exposition", Chicago, Illinois
 1942, "First Atlanta University Annual Exhibition of Works by Negro Artists", Atlanta University (now Clark Atlanta University), Atlanta, Georgia
 1946, "Negro Artist Comes of Age", Providence, Rhode Island
 1992–1994, "Bridges and Boundaries: African-Americans and American Jews", a traveling group exhibition shown at New York Historical Society in New York City; Jewish Museum in San Francisco; Strong Museum at Rochester; the Jewish Historical Society of Maryland and the Eubie Blake National Museum and Cultural Center (now Eubie Blake Cultural Center) in Baltimore; National Afro-American Museum and Cultural Center in Wilberforce, Ohio; California Afro-American Historical and Cultural Museum in Los Angeles; the National Museum of American Jewish History (now Weitzman National Museum of American Jewish History) in Philadelphia, and the Chicago Historical Society (now Chicago History Museum) in Chicago.

Collections

References 

1910 births
1990 deaths
African-American printmakers
American jewellers
Artists from Atlanta
Morehouse College alumni
Rhode Island School of Design alumni
20th-century African-American people
Artists from Providence, Rhode Island